Black Mamba is a government anti-terrorism organization in Uganda, under President Yoweri Museveni.

References 

 
 
 
 

Government of Uganda
Counterterrorism
Paramilitary organisations based in Uganda